A search appliance is a type of computer which is attached to a corporate network for the purpose of indexing the content shared across that network in a way that is similar to a web search engine. It may be made accessible through a public web interface or restricted to users of that network. A search appliance is usually made up of: a gathering component, a standardizing component, a data storage area, a search component, a user interface component, and a management interface component.

Vendors of search appliances 

 Fabasoft
Google
InfoLibrarian Search Appliance™ 
 Maxxcat
 Searchdaimon
 Thunderstone

Former/defunct vendors of search appliances 

 Black Tulip Systems
 Google Search Appliance
 Index Engines
 Munax
 Perfect Search Appliance

References

External links 
 7 Enterprise Search Appliances That Can Save the Day 

Computer hardware
Information retrieval systems
Internet search
Computing-related lists